Roland Bevan (October 12, 1888 – August 16, 1957) was an American football and college basketball coach. He served as the head football coach at St. Mary's College—now known as the University of Dayton— from 1911 to 1912 and Muskingum University in Concord, Ohio from 1913 to 1914, compiling a career college football coaching record of 12–12–2. After serving as a high school football coach at several stops in Ohio, he made his way to Dartmouth College, where he was a trainer.

At the time of his death in 1957, he was working as a trainer for the United States Military Academy at West Point, New York.

Head coaching record

College football

References

1888 births
1957 deaths
Basketball coaches from Ohio
Bucknell University alumni
Dayton Flyers football coaches
Muskingum Fighting Muskies football coaches
Ohio Northern Polar Bears football coaches
Ohio Northern Polar Bears men's basketball coaches
High school football coaches in Ohio
People from Fairfield County, Ohio
Players of American football from Ohio